Gilbert Kaburu (born November 8, 1981) is a Ugandan former swimmer, who specialized in sprint freestyle events. He represented his nation Uganda at the 2008 Summer Olympics, placing himself among the top 85 swimmers in the 50 m freestyle.

Kaburu was invited by FINA to compete as a 26-year-old swimmer for the Ugandan team in the men's 50 m freestyle at the 2008 Summer Olympics in Beijing. Swimming on the outside in heat four, he raced to seventh in a splash-and-dash finish with a time of 27.72 seconds, but placed further in eighty-second overall out of ninety-seven entrants at the end of the evening prelims.

Shortly after the Olympics, Kaburu announced his retirement from swimming career, to continue his education at TCNJ’s Graduate Global Programs in Johannesburg, South Africa.

References

External links
NBC Olympics Profile

1981 births
Living people
Ugandan male freestyle swimmers
Commonwealth Games competitors for Uganda
Swimmers at the 2006 Commonwealth Games
Olympic swimmers of Uganda
Swimmers at the 2008 Summer Olympics
Sportspeople from Kampala